Andrew Johnson (born January 10, 1972) is an American professional golfer.

Johnson was born in Columbus, Indiana. He played college golf at Ball State University and turned professional in 1995.

Johnson played on the Canadian Tour from 2000 to 2004, the Challenge Tour in 2003 and the Nationwide Tour from 2005 to 2009. His best finish is a win at the 2005 Cleveland Open on the Nationwide Tour.

Professional wins (1)

Nationwide Tour wins (1)

References

External links

American male golfers
Ball State Cardinals men's golfers
PGA Tour golfers
Golfers from Indiana
Golfers from Orlando, Florida
People from Columbus, Indiana
1972 births
Living people